The West Wales Museum of Childhood  is a museum in Wales which opened in 2005 and now forms a major educational resource in South and West Wales.

Location 
The West Wales Museum of Childhood is located in Llangeler being near to the historic town of Newcastle Emlyn along the A484, the Carmarthen to Cardigan road. It is sited in the River Teifi river valley only a short distance from the Welsh National Woollen Museum (latterly known as the National Wool Museum) at Drefach Felindre.

Exhibits 
There are more than 10,000 items on display in the five galleries of the museum, some of which may be viewed on the Museum's official website. Exhibits include toys, dolls, model trains, model cars, teddy bears, toy soldiers, tin toys, costumes, pinball machines, games, a period schoolroom, and household items. There are many toys and collectible items related to movies and television shows, including Doctor Who, Batman, The Avengers and Chitty Chitty Bang Bang.

The whole of the museum complex complies with high standards of accessibility. The museum has also been awarded accreditation under VisitWales VAQAS -the Welsh Assembly Government's Visitor Attraction Quality Accreditation Scheme 

The museum is a privately run enterprise and receives no outside funding. It is dependent upon attracting tourists as well as students and study groups in order to be viable and available as a community and educational resource.

See also
 Museums in Wales
 National Woollen Museum of Wales

References

External links
 West Wales Museum of Childhood’s Official Website
 Gathering the Jewels
 Visit Wales

Children's museums in the United Kingdom
Toy museums in Wales
Museums in Carmarthenshire
Mass media museums in the United Kingdom
Museums established in 2005
2005 establishments in Wales